The Chief Justice of the Supreme Court of Norway is the judicial leader of the Supreme Court of Norway.

The following is a chronological list of chief justices since the court was established:

 1814–27:   Johan Randulf Bull - Named in 1814, but the Supreme Court was formally established in 1815.
 1827–30:   Christian Magnus Falsen - Was only active a few weeks in the spring and summer of 1828 on account of illness.
 1831–35:   Jørgen Mandix
 1836–54:   Georg Jacob Bull
 1855–73:   Peder Carl Lasson
 1874–77:   Hans Gerhard Colbjørnsen Meldahl
 1878–86:   Iver Steen Thomle
 1887–1900: Morten Diderik Emil Lambrechts
 1900–08:   Einar Løchen
 1909–20:   Karenus Kristofer Thinn
 1920–29:   Herman Scheel
 1929–46:   Paal Berg
 1946–52:   Emil Stang
 1952–58:   Sverre Grette
 1958–69:   Terje Wold
 1969–84:   Rolv Ryssdal
 1984–91:   Erling Sandene
 1991–2002: Carsten Smith
 2002–2016:   Tore Schei
 2016–: Toril Marie Øie

References

Law of Norway
Supreme Court of Norway

sv:Høyesterettsjustitiarius#Lista över høyesterettsjustitiarier